Hobart Zebras Football Club (also known as Tilford Zebras or just Zebras) was an association football club based in Hobart, Tasmania, Australia. The club is one of the biggest and most successful clubs in Tasmania. It competes in competitions run by the governing body Football Federation Tasmania, including the NPL Tasmania. The club uses the colours of Juventus F.C. and have historical ties and links to the club.  They merged with Clarence United FC after the 2019 season to form Clarence Zebras FC.

History
The club was founded in 1956 under the name "Juventus Soccer Club". The club competed on the national stage in the 1985 and 1986 NSL Cup competitions.

They were primarily known as "Hobart Juventus" until 1997.  In 1997, Australian soccer made the decision to end ethnic affiliations between Australian football teams, as a result the club changed its name to Hobart Zebras FC in 1998. Despite the ban on such affiliations, the club still has strong links to the expatriate Italian community in Hobart.

Hobart Zebras are one of the states most successful sides, having been state champions 8 times, most recently in 1993, and southern champions 9 times, most recently in 2004. 2007 saw the club win the State Premiership, Southern Premiership and the Summer Cup. 2010 saw the club under new management with former player Romeo Frediani.  This turned out to be a trophyless year for the club starting a disappointing era under Frediani.

The women's team won the Super League in 2019.

At the end of the 2019 season, they merged with Clarence United to form Clarence Zebras FC.

Managers
2010–2011: Romeo Frediani
2012: Eammon Kelly
2015: Chris Hey
2016–2017: Peter Savill
2017: Tommy Fotak
2017–2018: Gabriel Markaj
2018–2019: David Smith

Seasons - Men

Honours
State Championships: 9 times (1969,1971,1972,1973,1983,1984,1985,1993,2007)
State Championship Runners-up: 1966,2004
Southern Premierships: 10 times (1969,1971,1972,1973,1979,1983,1984,1985,2004,2007)
Southern Premiership Runners-up: 6 times (1960,1965,1966,1967,1970,2003)
KO Cup Winners:  7 times (1967,1971,1975,1982,1983,2001,2003)
KO Cup Runners-up: 7 times (1969,1976,1978,1981,1987,1988,1989)
Falkinder Cup Runners-up: 3 times (1963,1966,1967)
Falkinder Association Cup Winners: Twice (1970,1973)
Summer Cup Winners: 9 times (1971,1972,1978,1981,1984,1986,1987,1989,2007,2008,2009)
Summer Cup Runners-up: 7 times (1976,1982,1985,1990,1991,1992,1996)
Association Cup Runners-up: Once (1968)
Ascot Gold Cup Winners: Once (1960)
Ascot Gold Cup Runners-up: Once (1961)
DJ Trophy Runners-up: Once (1976)
Lloyd Triestino Cup Winners: Once (1974)
Cadbury Trophy Winners: 5 times (1984,1987,1989,1990,1991)
Cadbury Trophy Runners-up: 3 times (1982,1983,1985)
Cadbury Charity Trophy: Once (1992)
Cadbury Charity Runners-up: Once (1991)

Notable past players

List includes players from Hobart Zebras youth or senior teams that have gone on to represent the Australian national team.

Dominic Longo

See also

List of sports clubs inspired by others

References

External links
Official website

National Premier Leagues clubs
Association football clubs established in 1956
Association football clubs disestablished in 2019
Italian-Australian backed sports clubs of Tasmania
Defunct soccer clubs in Australia
Defunct soccer clubs in Tasmania
1956 establishments in Australia
2019 disestablishments in Australia
Sport in Hobart